Monticello Conte Otto is a town and comune in the province of Vicenza, Veneto, Italy. It is east of the SP248 provincial road.

The main attraction is the Villa Valmarana Bressan, attributed to Andrea Palladio.

References

Sources
(Google Maps)

Cities and towns in Veneto